Improtheater Emscherblut  is a theatre group in North Rhine-Westphalia, Germany.

Theatre companies in Germany